María José Pons Gómez (born 8 August 1984), commonly known as Mariajo, is a Spanish footballer who plays as a goalkeeper for the Catalonia women's national football team. She previously played for CD Sabadell, FC Barcelona, Levante UD, with whom she won one League and one Cup, and Valencia. She was a key player in the league success, conceding nine goals in 25 matches. She had previously won the 2003 Cup with CE Sabadell. During her four seasons with Espanyol (2009–2013) she added two further Cup winner's medals to her collection.

She is a member of the Spain women's national football team, where she is a reserve goalkeeper as of the 2013 European Championship qualifying. When regular custodian Ainhoa Tirapu was injured, Mariajo stood in for qualifying games against Switzerland and Turkey.

In June 2013, national team coach Ignacio Quereda confirmed Mariajo as a member of his 23-player squad for the UEFA Women's Euro 2013 finals in Sweden.

Titles
 1 Spanish League (2008)
 4 Spanish Cups (2003, 2007, 2010, 2012)

References

1984 births
Living people
Footballers from Catalonia
Spanish women's footballers
Women's association football goalkeepers
Sportspeople from Sabadell
Spain women's international footballers
Primera División (women) players
FC Barcelona Femení players
RCD Espanyol Femenino players
CE Sabadell Femení players
Levante UD Femenino players
Valencia CF Femenino players
Zaragoza CFF players
Sportswomen from Catalonia